Wardhannapet is a census town and a municipality in Warangal district in the state of Telangana in India.

 List of Villages in Wardhannapet municipality
1. Bandauthapur 2. Chennaram 3. Dammannapet 4. Divitipalle 5. Inole 6. Kakkiralapalle 7. Katrial 8. Kothapalle 9. Liabarthy 10. Nallabelle 11. Nandanam 12. Panthini 13. Punnole 14. Ramavaram 15. Singaram 16. Upprapalle 17. Wardhannapet 18. Yellanda .

References
 villageinfo.in

Villages in Warangal district
Mandals in Warangal district